Brasstracks are an American R&B-hip hop production duo based in Alphabet City, Manhattan, New York, composed of Ivan Jackson and Conor Rayne. They won two Grammy Awards for their work on Chance the Rapper's single "No Problem", and released their debut full-length album Golden Ticket on August 21, 2020.

History
Jackson and Rayne formed Brasstracks in 2014 after meeting while attending the Manhattan School of Music, where Jackson was a trumpet player and Rayne a drummer. Jackson is originally from Manhattan and Rayne is originally from New Jersey. They primarily use live instrumentation, with Jackson on brass instruments and Rayne on drums. Their first track was the instrumental "Say U Will", and their first EP, Good Love, was released on August 19, 2016. It includes collaborations with Roses Gabor, Jay Prince, Lido, and Masego.

The duo produced the single "No Problem" by Chance the Rapper featuring 2 Chainz and Lil Wayne, off Chance the Rapper's 2016 mixtape Coloring Book. They appeared on "Am I Wrong" by Anderson .Paak featuring Schoolboy Q, and have produced and written for Wyclef Jean, GoldLink, Harry Styles, Khalid, and Mark Ronson. In 2017, they released the EP For Those Who Know Pt. I. It includes collaborations with Robert Glasper, The Underachievers, Bxrber, and S'natra. They released part 2 of the EP the following year.

In 2019, they signed with Capitol Records, and released the live EP Before We Go: Live From Capitol Studios, featuring live versions of their EP Before We Go from earlier in the year. Before We Go features guest spots from R.LUM.R, Grace, and Pell, and is a shift to a more R&B and hip hop style from their previous jazzy electronic sound. In May 2020, in advance of their debut full-length album Golden Ticket, they released the lead single "Change For Me" featuring Samm Henshaw, followed by the second single "Missed Your Call" featuring Col3trane, and then the single "Golden Ticket" featuring Masego and Common. Golden Ticket was released on Capitol Records on August 21, 2020.

They have toured with Lido, Mr. Carmack, Jack Garratt, GRiZ, and Big Gigantic. In 2019, they appeared alongside Miley Cyrus and Mark Ronson on Saturday Night Live, performing "Nothing Breaks Like a Heart".

Members
 Ivan Jackson (horns, production)
 Conor Rayne (drums, production)

Awards

Discography

Albums

EPs

Singles
 "Say U Won't" (2016)
 "Favorite" (2017)
 "Those Who Know" (2017)
 "All of the Lights" feat. Alexander Lewis (Kanye West cover) (2017)
 "Good Kid Brass City" (Kendrick Lamar cover) (2018)
 "Vibrant" feat. Pell (2018)
 "Improv #1" (live) (2018)
 "Opposite Ways" (live) (2018)
 "Stay There" (2018)
 "In My Feelings" (Drake cover) (2018)
 "Too Far Too Fast" (2018)
 "I'm Alright" feat. R.LUM.R (2019)
 "Professional" feat. Kyle Dion (2019)
 "Snowdaze" feat. Charles Gaines (2019)
 "Always Be My Baby" (Mariah Carey cover) (2019)
 "Change For Me" feat. Samm Henshaw (2020)
 "Missed Your Call" feat. Col3trane (2020)
 "Hold Ya" feat. Lawrence (2020)
 "Will Call" feat. Elliott Skinner and Victoria Canal (2020)
 "Golden Ticket" feat. Masego and Common (2020)
 "My Boo (Ghost Town DJ's cover) (2020)
 "What's Next" (Drake cover) (2021)
 "Still Life" feat. Tori Kelly (2021)

Producing and writing credits

References 

Rhythm and blues duos
American musical duos
American hip hop record producers
Record producers from New York (state)
Manhattan School of Music alumni
Capitol Records artists